Great Southern Bank (formerly Credit Union Australia or CUA) is a customer-owned bank based in Brisbane, Queensland, Australia. As of 2013, it is the largest customer-owned financial institution in Australia. It offers banking and insurance services to 420,000 Australians.

Overview
Great Southern Bank is a mutual bank. It is Australia's largest customer-owned banking organisation with over 40 branches located around Australia, largely on the east coast. The contact centres are located in Sydney and Melbourne. It is also a member of the Customer Owned Banking Association (COBA), adhering to a Customer Owned Banking Code of Practice 

Great Southern Bank has two fully owned subsidiary companies – CUA Health Ltd (Health Insurance) and Credicorp Insurance ltd (consumer credit insurance). On 26 May 2021, it was announced that CUA Health Ltd would be sold to HBF.

History
The earliest precursor to Great Southern Bank was officially founded in 1946. It was created through the amalgamation of several small Queensland-based credit unions in the 1940s and had around 180 members in total. Since then, through the joining of more than 171 credit unions , it has become the biggest customer-owned bank in Australia.

Timeline

Recent recognition/awards 

 Forbes - Worlds Best Banks 2022
 Canstar - Customer-Owned Institution of the Year winner 2022 
 Canstar - Savings 2022

Sponsorship 
Principal partner - Brisbane Heat Cricket team 

Major sponser - Carlton AFL team

See also 

 Banking in Australia
 List of banks in Australia
 List of banks in Oceania

References

External links 

 Official website

Banks established in 1946
Credit unions of Australia
Australian companies established in 1946